Lennart-Marten Quint Czyborra (born 3 May 1999) is a German professional footballer who plays as a left-back for  club Genoa.

Club career
Lennart Czyborra played in the youth sides 1. FV Eintracht Wandlitz, FV Motor Eberswalde, Union Berlin, Hertha BSC, Energie Cottbus and Schalke 04. In 2018 he left for Heracles Almelo. He made his Eredivisie debut on 11 August 2018 in a 1–1 draw against AFC Ajax. He came into the field in the 82nd minute for Bart van Hintum.

On 22 January 2020, Czyborra signed with Italian Serie A club Atalanta. He made his club debut on 14 July in a 6–2 win against Brescia. On 9 September 2020, he joined Genoa on a two-year loan deal with obligation to buy.

Personal life
Czyborra's brother, Michael, is also a professional footballer.

Career statistics

Honours
Individual
 Eredivisie Talent of the Month: October 2019

References

External links
 

Living people
1999 births
German footballers
Association football defenders
Footballers from Berlin
Germany youth international footballers
Heracles Almelo players
Atalanta B.C. players
Genoa C.F.C. players
Arminia Bielefeld players
Eredivisie players
Serie A players
Serie B players
Bundesliga players
German expatriate footballers
German expatriate sportspeople in the Netherlands
Expatriate footballers in the Netherlands
German expatriate sportspeople in Italy
Expatriate footballers in Italy